Richard J. J. Hart (3 April 1920 – 5 January 1990) was a British painter. His work was part of the painting event in the art competition at the 1948 Summer Olympics.

References

1920 births
1990 deaths
20th-century British painters
British male painters
Olympic competitors in art competitions
People from the Isle of Sheppey
20th-century British male artists